Thomas Adair may refer to:
 T. B. S. Adair (Thomas Benjamin Stratton Adair, 1868–1928), British admiral and Scottish Unionist Party MP
 Tom Adair (1913–1988), American songwriter and screenwriter

See also
 Thomas Adair Butler (1836–1901), British recipient of the Victoria Cross